Johannes Cornelis Maria "Hans" Koeleman (born 5 October 1957) is a retired Dutch middle- and long-distance runner. He competed in the steeplechase at the 1984 and 1988 Summer Olympics, but failed to reach the finals. In this event he won a medal at every national championship between 1977 and 1988.

References

1957 births
Living people
Athletes (track and field) at the 1984 Summer Olympics
Athletes (track and field) at the 1988 Summer Olympics
Dutch male long-distance runners
Dutch male steeplechase runners
Olympic athletes of the Netherlands
People from Uithoorn
Dutch ultramarathon runners
Male ultramarathon runners
Universiade medalists in athletics (track and field)
World Athletics Championships athletes for the Netherlands
Universiade bronze medalists for the Netherlands
Sportspeople from North Holland
20th-century Dutch people